8 Armed Monkey is the debut album by KTU. It was drawn from the group's first few live performances in Japan and Finland, and released in 2005.

Track listing

Personnel
Kimmo Pohjonen - accordion, voice
Samuli Kosminen - accordion samples, voice samples
Pat Mastelotto - drums and rhythmic devices
Trey Gunn - Warr guitar

References

External links
KTU 8 Armed Monkey (p)REVIEW @ projekction.net
8 Armed Monkey @ Amazon.com
KTU Official Myspace

2005 debut albums
KTU (band) albums